Benny Gordon may also refer to:
 Benny Gordon American stock car racing driver
 Benny Gordon (singer) American soul singer

Similar names
 See also Ben Gordon (disambiguation)